Ivan Rebernik  (born October 7, 1939 in Maribor) is a Slovenian librarian. He is a former Slovenian ambassador to Vatican and Chancellor of the Order of the Holy Sepulchre.

Education 
He received his bachelor's degree in theology and the doctorate in philosophy at the Pontifical Gregorian University. In 1984, Rebernik studied the administration of an automated library as a visiting professional at the Smithsonian Institution and at the Catholic University of America.

Besides his native Slovene, he speaks English, Italian, Serbo-Croatian, German, Russian, French and Spanish.

Career 
From 1964 to 1988 he worked at the library of Pontifical Gregorian University.

From 1972 to 1976 he worked at RAI in Rome, where he was responsible for daily 20-minute radio broadcasts in Slovene.

Vatican Library 
From 1980 to 2004 he was working at the Vatican Library. At first, a librarian and a teacher of general rules and services at the School of library science.

From 1988 he spent 16 years as the director of the prints catalogue of the Vatican Library.

Ambassador of Slovenia to the Holy See 
Since 1994, he worked as an adviser of the Embassy of Slovenia to the Holy See and in 2016 he was appointed Ambassador. On September 16, 2006, he presented the letters of credence to Benedict XVI. His term ended in 2010 and he was succeeded by Maja Marija Lovrenčič Svetek.

Order of the Holy Sepulchre 
In 2000 he became a member of the Order of the Holy Sepulchre.

In 2012 he was appointed Chancellor of the Order of the Holy Sepulchre by Grand Master Cardinal O'Brien. He chaired the work of the Commission on Appointments and Promotions, was in charge of the communications development including work on the Order's new website in five languages, and of the reorganization of the Grand Magisterium's archive. In 2016 his term has ended and Alfredo Bastianelli succeeded him.

On December 12, 2016, Rebernik was appointed Chancellor of Honor.

Personal life 
Since 1960 he has lived in Rome. Rebernik is married and has three children.

Honours 
In 1978 he became a Member of the Görres Society Historical Institutes

In 2000 he became a Knight of the Order of Malta

In 2002 he was awarded the Order of St. Bridget of Sweden

In 2009 he became a Knight Grand Cross of the Order of Pope Pius IX

In 2011 he was awarded Order of Saints Cyril and Methodius

In 2016 he received the Golden Palm of Jerusalem

References 

Living people
1939 births
Ambassadors of Slovenia to the Holy See
People associated with the Vatican Library
Knights of the Holy Sepulchre
Knights Grand Cross of the Order of Pope Pius IX
Knights of Malta
Slovenian librarians